Josh Soares (born February 6, 1982) is a Canadian professional ice hockey forward for the Hamilton Steelhawks of Allan Cup Hockey. Before returning to Canada to play senior ice hockey, Soares had a long career in Europe, including a four-season tenure in Norway for the Stavanger Oilers, with whom he won the GET-ligaen playoffs three times, being the top scorer and elected to the all-star team in the 2015–16 season.

Awards and honours

References

External links

1982 births
Living people
Canadian people of Portuguese descent
Alaska Aces (ECHL) players
Canadian ice hockey forwards
Chicago Wolves players
Graz 99ers players
Ice hockey people from Ontario
IK Oskarshamn players
Kassel Huskies players
Maine Black Bears men's ice hockey players
Manitoba Moose players
Peoria Rivermen (AHL) players
Sportspeople from Hamilton, Ontario
Stavanger Oilers players
Växjö Lakers players
Vienna Capitals players
Canadian expatriate sportspeople in the United States
Canadian expatriate ice hockey players in Austria
Canadian expatriate ice hockey players in Norway
Canadian expatriate ice hockey players in Germany
Canadian expatriate ice hockey players in Sweden